Monrovia High School is a public high school located in Monrovia, Indiana.

Athletics 
In 2014 Monrovia joined the Indiana Crossroads conference after previously being in the West Central conference. In 2015 the Bulldogs won the IHSAA football 2A Championship. Monrovia's gymnasium is named after legendary Indiana basketball coach and Monrovia alumni, Branch McCracken.

Notable Alumni 

 Branch McCracken, former Indiana University basketball coach
 John Standeford, former wide receiver in the NFL
 Gary Bettenhausen, Indycar and NASCAR driver
 Tony Bettenhausen Jr., Indycar and NASCAR driver

See also
 List of high schools in Indiana

References

External links
 Official Website

Buildings and structures in Morgan County, Indiana
Public high schools in Indiana